Mironić is a village in the municipality of Aerodrom, Serbia. According to the 2002 census, the village has a population of 99 people.

References

Populated places in Šumadija District